Greenwood Cemetery is a historic cemetery established in 1874, and located at 6571 St. Louis Avenue in Hillsdale, Missouri. This was the first non-denominational commercial cemetery for African-Americans in the St. Louis area.

It was listed on the National Register of Historic Places in February 24, 2004.

History 
Greenwood Cemetery was established in 1874 by Herman Krueger, it has approximately 6,000 marked graves but is thought to contain up to 50,000 burials.  

In 1890, the cemetery was sold to Krueger's son-in-law, Adolph Foelsch; the Foelsch family owned and operated the cemetery, including manufacturing concrete tombstones, until 1981. Those buried at Greenwood include former enslaved people, war veterans, members of fraternal organizations, artists, laborers and middle class African-Americans, as well as a number of famous and prominent African-Americans from St. Louis. 

Many of the people buried at Greenwood were originally from southern states and had participated in the Great Migration north. Funerals were numerous in Greenwood in the mid-twentieth century, but with desegregation, the cemetery saw a decline in use. In the 1980s it began to go derelict. It permanently closed in the 1990s and continued to stand abandoned for most of a decade. In 1999, the nonprofit group Friends of Greenwood Cemetery, Inc. was formed for the purpose of restoring and preserving the site as a historic park. Eventually the group gained ownership of the cemetery.

Volunteers from the Greenwood Cemetery Preservation Association have worked to maintain the grounds and preserve African American history.

Other nearby historic African American cemetery include the Washington Park Cemetery (1920), Father Dickson Cemetery (1903), and Quinette Cemetery (1866).

Notable interments
 Walter Davis (1910–1963), blues musician
 Grant Green (1935–1979), jazz musician
 Harriet Robinson Scott (1815–1876), wife of Dred Scott
 Lee Shelton (1865–1912; also known as “Stagger” Lee), American folk figure
Charlton Tandy (1836–1919), public official, civil rights activist, lawyer, newspaper publisher

See also 

 National Register of Historic Places listings in St. Louis County, Missouri

References

External links
 
 
 

Cemeteries on the National Register of Historic Places in Missouri
Buildings and structures in St. Louis County, Missouri
National Register of Historic Places in St. Louis County, Missouri
1874 establishments in Missouri
Cemeteries established in the 1870s
African-American history of Missouri